Alvesta station is a railway station in Alvesta. The station was inaugurated in 1909 and is one of the main railway transit stations in Sweden, binding together the Southern Main Line between Malmö and Stockholm with the Coast-to-Coast Line between Gothenburg and Kalmar/Karlskrona.

See also
Rail transport in Sweden

References

Railway stations on the Southern Main Line
Railway stations opened in 1909
1909 establishments in Sweden
Buildings and structures completed in 1909
Railway stations in Kronoberg County
Transit centers in Sweden